Jacob Ballas Children's Garden is a children's garden in the Singapore Botanic Gardens. Named after Jacob Ballas, the garden was the first children's garden in Asia.

History
Plans for a children's garden in the Singapore Botanic Gardens were first announced in 2005. The garden opened on 1 October 2007, becoming the first children's garden in Asia, costing $7 million to construct.

Following the 2ha expansion in 2017, the garden became the largest children's garden in Asia.

References

Parks in Singapore